Henry Gidel is a French biographer. He won the Prix Goncourt for biography for his life of Sacha Guitry. Other subjects have included Charles de Gaulle and his wife, Georges Pompidou and his wife, Georges Feydeau, Jackie Kennedy, Picasso, Sarah Bernhardt, Coco Chanel and Marie Curie.

References

French writers
Date of birth missing (living people)
Place of birth missing (living people)
Living people
Year of birth missing (living people)